The Normans Kill is a  creek in New York's Capital District located in Schenectady and Albany counties. It flows southeasterly from its source in the town of Duanesburg near Delanson to its mouth at the Hudson River in the town of Bethlehem. In the town of Guilderland, the stream is dammed to create the Watervliet Reservoir, a drinking water source for the city of Watervliet and the Town of Guilderland. A one megawatt hydrolectric plant at the dam provides power to pump water to the filtration plant.

The Normans Kill has been used historically as a source of water power during colonial times, during which many mills sprung up along its banks. Prior to the Industrial Revolution, blocks of ice were cut out of the creek for shipment to the city of New York as a form of early refrigeration. Its name is derived from the Dutch word for a Norwegian, who the Dutch called "North Men or Normans", hence North Man's Stream/Creek" the ethnicity of Albert Andriessen Bradt (originally spelled "Bratt"), an early settler who owned sawmills near the first waterfall of the creek in the early 17th century, and the  word kill, Dutch for creek. Earlier names of the stream include Godyns Kil, Norman's Kill, Normans Kil, and the indigenous place name Ta-wa-sen-tha, Ta-wal-sou-tha, or Tawalsontha. Locals call and spell it Normanskill (one word) Creek

Geography
The last  is tidal.

History
Originally called "Tawasentha" (a place of the many dead), the Normans Kill is named for Albert Andriessen Bradt, a Norwegian immigrant to Rensselaerswyck. The creek is named for his Norwegian (Norman) heritage. He was one of the first Scandinavians to the Dutch colony of New Netherland. He was a tobacco planter and as such came to the area of the Normans Kill for that purpose. He proceeded to construct two sawmills along the Normans Kill.

Tributaries
 Vly Creek - Vlaie meaning "swamp" in Dutch.
 Krum Kill
 Hunger Kill
 East Branch Hunger Kill
 Blockhouse Creek
 Kaikout Kill
 Bozen Kill
 Wolf Creek
 Bonny Brook
 Indian House Creek

I-os-co is the historical Native American name for a tributary of Normans Kill in Guilderland, but its current name is not known.

See also
List of rivers of New York

References

External links
 
The Norman of the Normanskill

Rivers of Albany County, New York
Rivers of Schenectady County, New York
Rivers of New York (state)
Tributaries of the Hudson River